Coláiste Chríost Rí is a Trusteeship Board Catholic secondary school for boys based on Capwell Road in Turners Cross, Cork, Ireland.

History
The school was founded by the Presentation Brothers and owned by the order until 21 November 2009. The school was opened in its current location in 1960, having previously been located in Kinsale Road and subsequently in Sawmill Street. It was designated the Cork School of Culture during Cork's tenure as European Capital of Culture in 2005.

Sport
Gaelic football is the principal sport played at the school. The school has won the Hogan Cup on four occasions: 1968, 1970, 1983 and 1985. Several former students have gone on to represent Cork GAA at inter-county level in both Gaelic football and hurling. A number of former students, including Damien Delaney, Denis Irwin, Chiedozie Ogbene, Frank O'Farrell and Kieran O'Regan,  have represented the Republic of Ireland national football team.

People

Former students

Politicians
 Dan Boyle – Green Party senator
 Barry Desmond – former government minister
 Micheál Martin – Tánaiste and leader of Fianna Fáil

Film and theatre
Shane Casey - actor
Bob Crowley - theatre designer
Dermot Crowley – actor

Broadcasters
 Ger Canning – sports commentator 
 Eddie Hobbs – television presenter

Association footballers
 Damien Delaney
 Denis Irwin
 Frank O'Farrell
 Noel O'Mahony
 Kieran O'Regan
 Chiedozie Ogbene

Athletes
 Robert Heffernan 
 Marcus O'Sullivan

Rugby union players
 Johnny Holland

Gaelic footballers
 Ray Cawley
 Luke Connolly
 Ray Cummins
 Billy Morgan
 Frank Cogan
 Ephie Fitzgerald
 Seán Hayes
 John Kerins
 Paul Kerrigan
 James Masters
 Brian Murphy
 Colin Corkery

Hurlers
 Jim Cashman
 Ray Cummins
 Darren McCarthy
 Brian Murphy
 Martin O'Doherty
 Fergal Ryan
Tony Maher

Others
 Greg Delanty – poet
 Andrew Fitzgibbon - engineer
 Patrick G. O'Shea – scientist, president of University College Cork

References

External links
 Official CCRí homepage

Boys' schools in the Republic of Ireland
Education in Cork (city)
Presentation Brothers schools
Secondary schools in County Cork
1938 establishments in Ireland
Educational institutions established in 1938